Today's Children is a 1922 German silent film directed by Adolf E. Licho and starring Paul Hartmann, Mady Christians, and Ludwig Hartau.

Cast

References

Bibliography

External links

1922 films
Films of the Weimar Republic
German silent feature films
Films directed by Adolf E. Licho
UFA GmbH films
German black-and-white films